Lip Sync Battle Shorties is an American reality television program that first aired on Nickelodeon as a special hosted by Sarah Hyland on December 11, 2016, and later returned as a regular television program on October 15, 2017. The program is presented by Nick Cannon and JoJo Siwa.

Production and broadcast 
On February 22, 2016, it was announced that Spike and Nickelodeon were developing Lip Sync Battle Jr. with Casey Patterson Entertainment and Matador, as a spinoff of Spike's Lip Sync Battle. On November 17, 2016, it was announced that Sarah Hyland would be hosting, and that an hour-long special would air on Nickelodeon on December 11, 2016, and on Spike on December 14, 2016.

On March 2, 2017, Nickelodeon announced that it had green-lit production on Lip Sync Battle Shorties with a 10-episode order. Production of the program was expected to begin sometime in 2017. On August 1, 2017, it was announced that Nick Cannon would be replacing Sarah Hyland as the host and that JoJo Siwa would be joining him as his sidekick. In the new format, it aired Halloween and holiday specials on Nickelodeon, in October and December 2017, respectively. The program will take its regular slot when new episodes resume on January 12, 2018.

On March 6, 2018, Nickelodeon renewed the program for a second season of 10 episodes.

Episodes

Series overview

Special (2016)

Season 1 (2017–18)

Season 2 (2018–19)

Ratings 
Lip Sync Battle Shorties drew more than two million total viewers in Live+7 when it first premiered in December 2016. In addition, content from the special had managed to get over 20 million views on Nickelodeon's YouTube channel.

 
                      
| link2             = #Season 2 (2018–19)
| episodes2         = 10
| start2            = 
| end2              = 
| startrating2      = 0.80
| endrating2        = 0.71
| viewers2          = |2}} 
}}

See also 
 Lip Sync Battle

References

External links 
 

2010s American children's television series
2010s American reality television series
2010s Nickelodeon original programming
2016 American television series debuts
2019 American television series endings
American television spin-offs
English-language television shows